The Minneapolis–St. Paul Airport Trams consist of a pair of cable-drawn automated people movers that serve travelers of the Minneapolis–Saint Paul International Airport. Both were constructed by the Poma-Otis Transit Company of Farmington, Connecticut and are operated under the direction of the Metropolitan Airports Commission.

Hub Tram
The older of the two systems, the Hub Tram, opened on April 3, 2001.
Costing $25 million to complete, the Hub Tram was originally scheduled to open in Fall 2000, but a computer glitch resulted in postponing its opening. Trams on this system, which is fully underground, operate on a cushion of air and there are no physical guide rails. The technology is identical to that of the ExpressTram at Detroit Metropolitan Wayne County Airport and the people mover at Cincinnati Northern Kentucky International Airport.

'C' Concourse People Mover
The newer of the two systems, the 'C' Concourse People Mover, opened on May 5, 2004.
Costing $36 million to complete, the 'C' Concourse tram was originally scheduled to open on June 1, 2002, but computer software problems and a collision with the vehicles resulted in postponing its opening to 2004.

References 

Public transportation in Minnesota
Transportation in Minneapolis
Airport people mover systems in the United States
Hovair people movers
Railway lines opened in 2001
Trams